El Picazo is a municipality located in the province of Cuenca, Castile-La Mancha, Spain. According to the 2006 census (INE), the municipality has a population of 872 inhabitants.

See also
Manchuela

References

Municipalities in the Province of Cuenca